Jindra Tichá (born 31 March 1937) is a Czech-born academic and writer living in New Zealand. In 2012, she was voted the 11th most influential Czech expatriate by the Czech public.

She was born in Prague and studied logic at Charles University in Prague, earning her PhD there. She married Pavel Tichý. After she and her husband were declared enemies of the state by the invading Russians in 1969, the couple moved to Exeter in England and then, in 1970, went to New Zealand. She lectured on philosophy and political science at the University of Otago where her husband also lectured.

Tichá first published short stories in the 1980s through the Canadian-based Czech publishing house 68 Publishers. It was not until after 1989 that her books began to appear in the Czech Republic.

Selected works 
 Cena porážky (2001)
 Pacific Letters, essays (2001)
 Dospělí milenci nemlčí (2004)
 Jak se investuje do nemovitostí na Novém Zélandu (2005)
 Přirozená linie ženského těla (2006)
 Incest (2007)

References 

1937 births
Living people
Czech novelists
Czech women novelists
Writers from Prague
Charles University alumni
Academic staff of the University of Otago
Czech women short story writers
Czech short story writers
Czech women essayists
Czech exiles